Soestduinen is a hamlet in the Dutch province of Utrecht. It is a part of the municipality of Soest, and lies about 3 km south of Soest.

The hamlet was first mentioned in 1936 as Soestduinen, and means the dunes near Soest. The railway station Soestduinen has existed between 1863 and 1998, and was called Soestduinen since 1922. The hamlet has always had place name signs, but since 2009, it reads Soest with Soestduinen underneath to emphasise that it is a hamlet belonging to Soest.

Gallery

References

Populated places in Utrecht (province)
Soest, Netherlands